Santo Domingo is a canton in the Heredia province of Costa Rica. The head city of the canton is the homonymous Santo Domingo district.

History 
Santo Domingo was created on 28 September 1869 by decree 9.

Geography 
Santo Domingo has an area of  km² and a mean elevation of  metres.

The Virilla River on the south and the Bermúdez River on the north establish the boundaries of this elongated province, which then climb up into the Cordillera Central (Central Mountain Range) with the Pará Blanca River.

Districts 
The canton of Santo Domingo is subdivided into the following districts:
 Santo Domingo
 San Vicente
 San Miguel
 Paracito
 Santo Tomás
 Santa Rosa
 Tures
 Pará

Demographics 

For the 2011 census, Santo Domingo had a population of  inhabitants.

Transportation

Road transportation 
The canton is covered by the following road routes:

Rail transportation 
The Interurbano Line operated by Incofer goes through this canton.

References 

Cantons of Heredia Province
Populated places in Heredia Province